David Howell may refer to:

David Howell (priest) (1831–1903), Dean of St David's Cathedral, 1897–1903
David Howell (jurist) (1747–1824), American jurist, Continental Congressman for Rhode Island
David Howell, Baron Howell of Guildford (born 1936), British Conservative MP, minister in Margaret Thatcher's cabinet
David Howell (cricketer) (born 1958), South African cricketer
David Howell (footballer) (born 1958), English footballer and manager
David Howell (golfer) (born 1975), English professional golfer from Swindon
David Howell (rugby league) (born 1983), Australian rugby league player currently playing for the Harlequins RL
David Howell (chess player) (born 1990), English chess grandmaster
David Howell (British Army officer), British barrister and officer
The Edge, real name David Howell Evans, guitarist of U2